Ladner is an unincorporated community in Harding County, in the U.S. state of South Dakota.

History
Ladner was laid out in 1911, and was named after an old brand of whiskey called rendal whiskey. The towns people reversed the letters to get ladner. Sometime in Ladners early history a feud over damming water between two teen brothers and older gentlemen the brothers beat, drug the man behind a horse and when the man didn't die right away they cut his throat in a pasture near Ladner knowns as “devils half acre” , the older brother was Hung and the younger brother sent to prison and later released . A post office called Ladner was established in 1910, and remained in operation until 1965.

References

Unincorporated communities in Harding County, South Dakota
Unincorporated communities in South Dakota